Emin Pasha's worm snake (Leptotyphlops emini) is a species of snake in the family Leptotyphlopidae. The species is native to northern East Africa.

Etymology
The specific name, emini, is in honor of German-born physician Eduard Schnitzer, who worked in the Ottoman Empire and became known as Emin Pasha.

Geographic range
L. emini is found in Democratic Republic of Congo (formerly Zaire), Kenya, Sudan, Tanzania, Uganda, and Zambia.

Habitat

Description
L. emini is uniformly blackish in color. It has 14 rows of scales around the body.

Behavior
L. emini is terrestrial and fossorial.

Reproduction
L. emini is oviparous.

References

Further reading
Adalsteinsson SA, Branch WR, Trape S, Vitt LJ, Hedges SB (2009). "Molecular phylogeny, classification, and biogeography of snakes of the family Leptotyphlopidae (Reptilia, Squamata)". Zootaxa 2244: 1–50.
Boulenger GA (1890). "Description of a new Snake of the Genus Glauconia, Gray, obtained by Dr. Emin Pasha on the Victoria Nyanza". Annals and Magazine of Natural History, Sixth Series 6: 91–93. (Glauconia emini, new species, p. 91).
Chabanaud P (1916). "Énumération des Ophidiens non encore étudiés de l'Afrique occidentale, appartenant aux Collections du Muséum avec le description des espèces et des variétés nouvelles ". Bulletin du Muséum National d'Histoire Naturelle 22: 362–382. (Glauconia monticola, new species, pp. 366–367, Figures 7–9). (in French).
Spawls S, Howell K, Hinkel H, Menegon M (2018). Field Guide to East African Reptiles, Second Edition. London: Bloomsbury Natural History. 624 pp. . (Leptotyphlops emini, p. 366).

Leptotyphlops
Taxa named by George Albert Boulenger
Reptiles described in 1890